Frederick William Macbeth, Jr. (December 26, 1909 – September 20, 1986) was a Canadian sprinter. He competed in the 400 m event at the 1928 Summer Olympics, but failed to reach the final. At the 1930 British Empire Games, Macbeth was eliminated in the heats of the 220 and 440 yards hurdles.

References

1909 births
1986 deaths
Canadian male hurdlers
Canadian male sprinters
Athletes (track and field) at the 1928 Summer Olympics
Olympic track and field athletes of Canada
Athletes (track and field) at the 1930 British Empire Games
Commonwealth Games competitors for Canada
Athletes from Hamilton, Ontario